The Roman Catholic Diocese of Viana is a diocese located in the city of Viana in the Ecclesiastical province of Luanda in Angola.

History
 June 6, 2007: Established as Diocese of Viana from the Metropolitan Archdiocese of Luanda

Leadership
 Bishops of Viana (Roman rite)
 Bishop Joaquim Ferreira Lopes, O.F.M. Cap (June 6, 2007 - February 11, 2019)
 Biahop Emílio Sumbelelo (February 11, 2019 - )

See also
Roman Catholicism in Angola

Sources
 GCatholic.org

Roman Catholic dioceses in Angola
Christian organizations established in 2007
Roman Catholic dioceses and prelatures established in the 21st century
Viana, Roman Catholic Diocese of